Staller is an Anglo-Saxon title that was held by various high-ranking officials of the crown during the 11th century. It ceased to be used in the 1070s.

Its origin, and exact meaning, are disputed. One suggestion is it derives from the Latin , or Count of the Stable, a title used in the Byzantine Empire, and later adopted by the Franks. Another likely possibility is that it is refers to a seat, or steall in the kings hall, one of the privileges granted to a thane, or royal retainer. However, these are both unproven.

It seems likely it was a different term for an existing position; the first confirmed occurrence in England was by Edward the Confessor, who used it for senior members of his personal household. Their duties appear to have been flexible; on a charter witnessed by stallers Ansgar, Bondi, Robert FitzWimarc, and Ralph in 1065, they are described as Royal stewards.

Anglo-Saxon office-holders 
Ansgar the Staller (fl 1044-1066)
Bondi the staller (fl 1065)
Eadnoth the Constable (died 1068), also known as Eadnoth the Staller
Osgod Clapa, London 
Ralph the Staller (1011–1068)
Robert FitzWimarc (died before 1075), also known as Robert the Staller
Tovi Pruda (fl. 1018–1043)

References

Sources

Anglo-Saxon England